Vasile Maftei (born 1 January 1981) is a Romanian retired footballer who played as a defender. He was best known for his leadership qualities, becoming captain for Rapid București, Unirea Urziceni, Concordia Chiajna and Voluntari. Although primarily a central defender, when needed he operated as a right back.

Maftei was formed at Rapid București, where he became a key part of the team, winning one league title in 2003, one Romanian Cup and one Super Cup in 2002. In 2004, following the departure of Adrian Iencsi, he was appointed captain and won two Romanian Cups in a row in 2006 and 2007 and one Super Cup in 2007. He also reached the UEFA Cup quarter-finals with Rapid in 2006, where they were eliminated by Steaua București.

On 26 February 2006, Maftei was called up to the Romania team for the first time, as a replacement for the injured Dorin Goian. Two days later, he scored on his Romania debut against Armenia from a header, in a 2–0 win for his country. Overall, he managed 12 caps for Romania.

Club statistics

International career
He made his international debut on 28 February 2006.

International stats

International goals

Honours

Club
Rapid București
 Divizia A: 2002–03
 Cupa României: 2001–02, 2005–06, 2006–07
 Supercupa României: 2002, 2003, 2007
 Liga IV – Bucharest: 2017–18
CFR Cluj
 Liga I: 2011–12
 Cupa României runner-up: 2012–13
 Supercupa României runner-up: 2012
FC Voluntari
 Cupa României: 2016–17
 Supercupa României: 2017

References

External links
 
 
 

1981 births
Living people
People from Fălticeni
Romanian footballers
Romania international footballers
Association football defenders
Liga I players
FC Rapid București players
FC Unirea Urziceni players
CFR Cluj players
CS Concordia Chiajna players
FC Voluntari players